Victoria Hall, Saltaire (originally the Saltaire Institute) is a Grade II* listed building in the village of Saltaire, near Bradford, West Yorkshire, England, built by architects Lockwood and Mawson.

History
Saltaire Institute was built by the architectural firm of Lockwood and Mawson between 1867 and 1871 for the industrialist and philanthropist Sir Titus Salt. It cost £25,000. In the original design, the building contained a main hall seating 800, a lecture room, two art rooms, a laboratory, a gymnasium, a library of 8,500 books and a reading room. For use of the building, a quarterly fee was charged. This ranged downwards from 2 shillings for adult males.

Architecture
Victoria Hall is a T-plan, two-storey building with a basement, constructed in ashlar, with rock-faced stone and a Welsh slate roof.

Exterior
To the front, the exterior has a symmetrical, eleven-bay Italianate facade, with vermiculated quoins at ground floor level and pilaster quoins to the first floor. The central bay of the building breaks forward. On top of this bay is an elaborate square tower with pyramidal ashlar roof. Each side of the tower has a modillioned segmental pediment on an enriched entablature, supported by Corinthian columns, framing slender, round-arched windows. The central portal has double, panelled doors, fanlight, and large open segmental pediment supported on large consoles. The tympanum has a cartouche bearing the Salt family coat of arms, flanked by the carved figures of Art and Science by Thomas Milnes. 

At basement level, the windows are square-headed, while at ground and first floor level the windows are round-arched and archivolted, the first floor windows being framed by fluted Corinthian colonnettes, and with carved head keystones and blind balustrade with turned balusters. There is a dentilled cornice between the ground and first floors. The modillioned cornice forms the base to a deep, panelled parapet decorated with rosettes and pedimented piers with grotesque winged beasts supporting iron finials. Three-bay return elevations.

The main hall projects at the rear. It is seven bays long by five bays wide with tall slender round-arched windows with glazing bars and circles in heads.

Interior
The entrance hall has a large, stone dog-leg staircase with large square piers and vertically symmetrical turned balusters. The main hall has an elaborately plastered, coffered roof. Pilasters mark the bay divisions and support a bracketed entablature. There is a raking gallery at the rear, on fluted cast-iron columns. The former side galleries have been removed and there is glass panelling at the rear.

Grounds
The building is set back from Victoria Road, on which it sits. There is a gardened square outside, bounded by a dwarf wall. At the front corners, on large square bases, are 2 sculpted lions, by Thomas Milnes of London, representing War and Peace. At the rear of the wall are round section cast-iron railings with spear-head finials on a dwarf wall.

Modern use
At the present time, it is commonly used as a concert venue. Memorable concerts held there include the homecoming gig of local group Terrorvision after they reunited in 2007. 

On 29 April 2010, the BBC TV series Antiques Roadshow was filmed at Victoria Hall. The show was broadcast in two parts on 13 and 20 March 2011.

See also
Antiques Roadshow, Series 33 (2010–11)
Saltaire gymnastics club

References

Buildings and structures in the City of Bradford
Shipley, West Yorkshire
Grade II* listed buildings in West Yorkshire